Liolaemus puelche is a species of lizard in the family Iguanidae.  It is found in Argentina.

References

puelche
Lizards of South America
Reptiles of Argentina
Endemic fauna of Argentina
Reptiles described in 2007
Taxa named by Luciano Javier Ávila
Taxa named by Mariana Morando
Taxa named by Jack W. Sites Jr.